This is a list of the top 50 singles in 2008 in New Zealand, as listed by the Recording Industry Association of New Zealand (RIANZ).

Chart
Songs in grey shading indicates a song of New Zealand origin.

Key
 – Song of New Zealand origin

Top 20 singles of 2009 by New Zealand artists 

 #6-20 are currently unavailable

Notes

References

External links
 The Official NZ Music Chart, RIANZ website

2008 in New Zealand music
2008 record charts
Singles 2008